"King for a Day" is the fourth single from British funk and acid jazz band Jamiroquai's fourth studio album, Synkronized (1999). The song was written by Jay Kay and is a "tribute" to bassist Stuart Zender, who left the band shortly before Synkronized was completed. Jay Kay subsequently rerecorded all the songs on the album without Zender, and added "King for a Day" as the final track on the album. Upon its release on 29 November 1999, the song reached number 20 on the UK Singles Chart. The video features Jay Kay walking around an old mansion, where each room has a member of the band.

Track listings
UK CD1 
 "King for a Day" – 3:38
 "Planet Home" (Trabant Brothers Inc. remix) – 7:20
 "Supersonic" (Dirty Rotten Scoundrels Ace Klub mix) – 6:58

UK CD2 
 "King for a Day" – 3:38
 "Canned Heat" (Shanks & Bigfoot extended Master mix) – 6:29
 "Supersonic" (radio edit) – 3:40
 "Supersonic" (multimedia video version) – 3:56

UK cassette single and European CD single 
 "King for a Day" – 3:38
 "Planet Home" (Trabant Brothers Inc. remix) – 7:20

European maxi-CD single 
 "King for a Day" – 3:38
 "Planet Home" (Trabant Brothers Inc. remix) – 7:20
 "Supersonic" (Dirty Rotten Scoundrels Ace Klub mix) – 6:58

Charts

References

Jamiroquai songs
1999 singles
1999 songs
S2 Records singles
Songs written by Jason Kay
Songs written by Toby Smith